The 2008 Internationaux de Nouvelle-Calédonie was a professional tennis tournament played on hard courts. It was the fifth edition of the tournament which was part of the 2008 ATP Challenger Series. It took place in Nouméa, New Caledonia between 1–6 January 2008.

Singles main-draw entrants

Seeds

 1 Rankings are as of 24 December 2007.

Other entrants
The following players received wildcards into the singles main draw:
  Maxime Chazal
  Jean-René Lisnard
  Nicolas N'Godrela
  Norikazu Sugiyama

The following players received entry from the qualifying draw:
  Anthony Azcoaga
  Aurélien David
  Philippe Poignon
  Yvonick Rivat

Champions

Singles

 Flavio Cipolla def.  Stéphane Bohli 6–4, 7–5.

Doubles

 Flavio Cipolla /  Simone Vagnozzi def.  Jan Mertl /  Martin Slanar 6–4, 6–4.

External links
Official Website

2008 ATP Challenger Series
2008
2008 in New Caledonian sport
2008 in French tennis